Minihawk or Mini Hawk may refer to:
Falconar Minihawk, a Canadian amateur-built aircraft design
Mini-Hawk Tiger-Hawk, an American light aircraft design